Mechademia: Second Arc is a biannual (formerly annual) peer-reviewed academic journal in English about Japanese popular culture products and fan practices. It is published by the University of Minnesota Press and the editor-in-chief is Frenchy Lunning.  Mechademia has also held an annual conference since 2001.

Volumes
Since 2006, ten volumes have been published. Each volume is dedicated to a collection of articles themed around a specific topic, such as shojo manga or anime and manga fandom.  It is indexed in Project MUSE and JSTOR.  After a break of three years, a new series of Mechademia volumes (Second Arc) will be published beginning in 2018, the first being themed around childhood. The scope of Mechademia will be broadened to include all of Asia in its remit.

Reception
Steve Raiteri from Library Journal commends Mechademia as a "great first effort [...] bridg[ing] the gap between academics and fans." Christophe Thouny, writing for Animation also thought the writing and tone was accessible by both academics and fans. Ed Sizemore from Comics Worth Reading criticizes the journal for its review and commentary section because they "read like summaries of the works (films and books) discussed with no actual critique of the work". However, Sizemore commends the journal's academic essay section. 

By contrast, Raiteri in Library Journal states that fans will find the Review and Commentary section "the most accessible" section of the journal. Kevin Gifford contrasts Mechademia with shallower works on anime, praising its "insightful essays and reviews" and detail, calling it "worthwhile reading for anyone hungry for intelligent writing" about anime. Tomo Hirai of the Nichi Bei Times described the first volume as "an informative and inspiring read for those curious beyond the skin of anime".

A review of the second volume of Mechademia by Comics Worth Reading's Johanna Draper Carlson criticises the journal for its dry tone and "flat statements following after each other separated only by footnote numbers". A later review by Ed Sizemore recommends that Mechademia "should stop trying to develop a theme for each issue". Active Anime's Holly Ellingwood comments that the journal's "strong academic bent may put off some potential readers but give it a chance and peruse through the many varied topics". A later review by Scott Campbell commends the third volume of Mechademia as being "extremely insightful and thought provoking ... [about] anime, manga, and even the future of mankind".  D. Harlan Wilson found the third volume to be "as accessible as it was provocative and enlightening".

William McClain criticises the fourth volume for having articles that are "too restrictive" in focus, calling attention to the lack of discussion, in this volume, of how anime and manga culture has spread internationally.  McClain also criticises the volume for not including enough visual aids for the general reader, but praises the Mechademia journal as a whole for its experimental approach. Ellen Grabiner feels that War/Time takes the approach that war has become a part of everyday life in post-war Japanese society, and praises the broad range of essays. Timothy Iles feels that the strength of Mechademia is that it provides "theoretically informed, historically grounded, jargon-free research that highlights first and foremost, not the self-serving virtuosity of the researcher, but the interpretive depth of the material under analysis."

Abstracting and indexing
According to Ulrichsweb, Mechademia is abstracted and indexed in EBSCOhost, Gale, OCLC, and ProQuest.

Most cited articles
According to Google Scholar, the three most-cited papers in Mechademia are:

References

Further reading

External links

 (New)

Anime and manga magazines
Media studies journals
University of Minnesota
Publications established in 2006
English-language journals
Annual journals
Japanese studies journals